Ooni Ajila Oorun was the 29th Ooni of Ife, a paramount traditional ruler of Ile Ife, the ancestral home of the Yorubas. He succeeded Ooni Omogbogbo and was succeeded by  
Ooni Adejinle.

References

Oonis of Ife
Yoruba history